Allegria (Italian; "joy") is the debut studio album by the Gipsy Kings, released in 1982 in Europe.

Overview
This album and its successor, Luna de Fuego, are very different from their later albums. They are both "unplugged" and traditional, using solely guitars, voices, and hand claps. The album includes two songs never released on a U.S. album ("Pharaon" and "Recuerda") and the original acoustic version of "Djobi Djoba".

In 1990, the album was merged with Luna de Fuego, while omitting certain tracks for a re-release to a US audience as Allegria (US Version).

Track listing

Credits
Edited By – Yves Desjardins
Photography By – Jacqueline Tarta
Producer – Sara Music
Recorded By – Pierre Braner
Written-By – Gipsykings, Los Reyes

Certifications and sales

References

External links
Allegria at gipsykings.net

1982 debut albums
Gipsy Kings albums